Rahul Roy (born 9 February 1968) is an Indian actor, producer and former model known for his works in Hindi films and television. Roy began his acting career with the 1990 blockbuster Aashiqui, a Mahesh Bhatt production as the lead actor with newcomer Anu Aggarwal. He then appeared opposite Karishma Kapoor in Sudhakar Bokade's romantic film Sapne Sajan Ke (1992). Roy has been honoured with life membership of the International Film And Television Club of Asian Academy of Film & Television.

Roy delivered a notable performance in Mahesh Bhatt's 1993 autobiographical Phir Teri Kahani Yaad Aayee, Roy's character is based on the filmmaker. The film was Zee TV's first mainstream production. Roy then featured in Bhatt's production Jaanam, which was Vikram Bhatt's directorial debut.

In 2006, Roy participated and won the first season of game show Bigg Boss – the Indian version of Celebrity Big Brother, produced by Endemol India for Colors Viacom 18. Roy has ventured into movie production. His company, Rahul Roy Productions, released its first movie, entitled Elaan, on 25 November 2011 in Bihar. It stars Roy and Rituparna Sen as the main lead.

Personal life 
Roy was born to Deepak and Indira Roy and educated at the Lawrence School, Sanawar. He has a brother named Romeer. His maternal uncle is Cory Walia, a renowned name in tinsel town, and on the fashion circuit. He was married to Rajlakshmi Khanvilkar (Rani), a fashion model, who had been previously married to Samir Soni.

Career 
During the early 1990s, Roy worked in several romantic films that did not do well, although his performances in Majhdhaar, Dilwale Kabhi Na Hare, Pyar Ka Saaya and Jaanam were liked. His best film performance is considered to be in Junoon. In the late 1990s, Roy played supporting actor roles. He got his big break from the 1990 film Aashiqui 

After Aashiqui, Roy signed a number of films. Apart from Junoon, most of them did not work. A lot of the films he had signed ended up being shelved.  K.Balachander's project Dilon Ka Rishta never saw the light due to the death of producer R. C. Prakash; another important project, Ayudh, was hit by the director's untimely death. Among other films shelved were Premabhishek, Tune Mera Dil Le Liya with Raveena Tandon, N. R. Pachisia's Dil Diya Chori Chori with Karishma Kapoor, Balwant Dullat's Phir Kabhi, Mahesh Bhatt's Kalyug, Harry Baweja's Vajra with Raveena Tandon and Shilpa Shirodkar and Jab Jab Dil Mile with Karishma Kapoor and Nagma.

Roy was to play the male lead in Mahesh Bhatt's Khilona, the Bollywood remake of the Kevin Costner thriller Revenge, but that was shelved as well. Roy returned to acting after four years in Meri Aashiqui (2005), in which he played the lead. His most recent films are the comedy Naughty Boy (2006) and Rafta Rafta, in which he portrayed the role of an underworld Don. He also appeared on the television program Bigg Boss, the Indian version of Celebrity Big Brother in 2006. He won the game show by public votes on 26 January 2007. Roy had made a comeback with Harikrit Films psychological thriller To B or Not to B.

Filmography

Films

Television 
1998: Kaise Kahoon 
2003-2004: Karishma – The Miracles of Destiny as Rahul
2006-2007: Bigg Boss 1 as Contestant (Winner)

References

External links 

 
 

1968 births
Living people
Male actors from Himachal Pradesh
Indian male models
Male actors in Hindi cinema
Reality show winners
Lawrence School, Sanawar alumni
21st-century Indian male actors
Bigg Boss (Hindi TV series) contestants
Big Brother (franchise) winners